Nemesis of the Roman Empire is a real-time strategy role-playing video game developed by Haemimont Games and published by Enlight Software. The sequel to Celtic Kings: Rage of War, the game is set in the Punic Wars and allows the player to take control of one of four nations, as well as Hannibal the Great.

In Spain the game was released on November 27, 2003 under the title Imperivm II: Conquest of Hispania, and in Italy as Imperivm II: The Punic Wars, by the publisher FX Interactive.

Gameplay
Nemesis of the Roman Empire is a real-time strategy role-playing game. Set during the Punic Wars, the player can take control of one of four nations: the Romans, the Gauls, the Carthaginians, and the Iberians.

Seeing the power and influence of Carthage, Roman legions were sent to Africa with orders to attack the rival city of Carthage, led by its general Hannibal.

Development
Nemesis of the Roman Empire was first announced on September 3, 2003 by developer Haemimont Games, who said that it would be set for release in Spain in December 2003. The game is a sequel to Celtic Kings: Rage of War, originally titled Celtic Kings: The Punic Wars. On January 13, 2004, Enlight Software announced they would be publishing and distributing the game in North America. On March 5, 2004, Enlight said the game had gone gold and was set for release on March 26.

Reception

Nemesis of the Roman Empire received "average" reviews according to the review aggregation website Metacritic. The game earned "Platinum" award from the Asociación Española de Distribuidores y Editores de Software de Entretenimiento (aDeSe), for more than 80,000 sales in Spain during its first 12 months. It ultimately sold above 250,000 units in Spain.

References

External links
  at Haemimont Games
  at FX Interactive 
  at Excalibur Publishing
 

2003 video games
Real-time strategy video games
Video games developed in Bulgaria
Video games set in the Roman Empire
Windows games
Windows-only games
Video games set in antiquity
Video games set in Italy
Video games set in Tunisia
Video games set in France
Video games set in Spain
Video games set in Africa